Chal Chendar (also Romanized as Chāl Chendār and Chāl-e Chenār) is a village in Barez Rural District, Manj District, Lordegan County, Chaharmahal and Bakhtiari Province, Iran. At the 2006 census, its population was 196, in 46 families.

References 

Populated places in Lordegan County